The 2011 2. deild karla was the third tier of Icelandic football in the 2011 season.

League table

Results grid

Top goalscorers

References
2011 2. deild karla top goalscorers at KSÍ.is
2011 2. deild karla results and final standings at KSÍ.is

2. deild karla seasons
Iceland
Iceland
3